Murun is a mountain in the Olyokma-Chara Plateau, at the border of Irkutsk Oblast and Yakutia, Russian Federation.

Geography
The mountain is near Torgo, an abandoned settlement in Olyokminsky District.

The Murun peak is marked as a  summit in the O-50 sheet of the Soviet Topographic Map. This same mountain, however, is a  peak in the D-7 sheet of the Defense Mapping Agency Navigation charts. The Irkutsk Oblast-Yakutia border runs across the middle of the Murun Massif and the peak rises on the western, or Irkutsk Oblast side.

Geology
The massif is part of the Aldan Shield geological region. Charoite, a rare mineral, is found in the area. Other minerals, such as Brookite, Tausonite, Yuksporite and Frankamenite are also found in the massif.

See also
List of mountains and hills of Russia

References

South Siberian Mountains
Mountains of Irkutsk Oblast
Mountains of the Sakha Republic
ceb:Gora Murun